In Galois theory, a branch of mathematics, the embedding problem is a generalization of the inverse Galois problem. Roughly speaking, it asks whether a given Galois extension can be embedded into a Galois extension in such a way that the restriction map between the corresponding Galois groups is given.

Definition
Given a field K and a finite group H, one may pose the following question (the so called inverse Galois problem). Is there a Galois extension F/K with Galois group isomorphic to H. The embedding problem is a generalization of this problem:

Let L/K be a Galois extension with Galois group G and let f : H → G be an epimorphism. Is there a Galois extension F/K with Galois group H and an embedding α : L → F fixing K under which the restriction map from the Galois group of F/K to the Galois group of L/K coincides with f?

Analogously, an embedding problem for a profinite group F consists of the following data: Two profinite groups H and G and two continuous epimorphisms φ : F → G and
f : H → G. The embedding problem is said to be finite if the group H is.
A solution (sometimes also called weak solution) of such an embedding problem is a continuous homomorphism γ : F → H such that φ = f γ. If the solution is surjective, it is called a proper solution.

Properties
Finite embedding problems characterize profinite groups. The following theorem gives an illustration for this principle.

Theorem. Let F be a countably (topologically) generated profinite group. Then 
 F is projective if and only if any finite embedding problem for F is solvable.
 F is free of countable rank  if and only if any finite embedding problem for F is properly solvable.

References
 Luis Ribes, Introduction to Profinite groups and Galois cohomology (1970), Queen's Papers in Pure and Appl. Math., no. 24, Queen's university, Kingstone, Ont.
 V. V. Ishkhanov, B. B. Lur'e, D. K. Faddeev, The embedding problem in Galois theory Translations of Mathematical Monographs, vol. 165, American Mathematical Society (1997).
 Michael D. Fried and Moshe Jarden, Field arithmetic, second ed., revised and enlarged by Moshe Jarden, Ergebnisse der Mathematik (3) 11, Springer-Verlag, Heidelberg, 2005.
 A. Ledet,  Brauer type embedding problems Fields Institute Monographs, no. 21, (2005).
 Vahid Shirbisheh, Galois embedding problems with abelian kernels of exponent p VDM Verlag Dr. Müller, (2009).
 Almobaideen Wesam, Qatawneh Mohammad, Sleit Azzam, Salah Imad, Efficient mapping scheme of ring topology onto tree-hypercubes , Journal of Applied Sciences,  2007

Group theory
Galois theory